Masłowo  is a village in the administrative district of Gmina Rawicz, within Rawicz County, Greater Poland Voivodeship, in west-central Poland. The 1837 census recorded a population of 186 residents and 29 households in Masłowo.

Notes

Villages in Rawicz County